The final Municipal elections for Sheffield - soon to be abolished by the Local Government Act 1972 - were held in May 1972, with one third up for vote, as well as an extra vacancy in Brightside.

The election seen Labour further their stranglehold on the council with four gains from the Conservatives, as they repeated the previous year's wins. One of the notable casualties from last year, Irvine Patnick, managed re-election via re-location to the safe Conservative ward of Broomhill. The Liberals, standing the lowest number of candidates (3) in over a decade, were rewarded for focusing their efforts on retaining their sole representation on the council, as they easily defended their by-election-won seat of Burngreave, more than sextupling their majority there. Labour were reported to be overjoyed to see the return of former councillor, and veteran of the party, Joe Albaya in Intake, after over a decade's absence.

Election result

The result had the following consequences for the total number of seats on the Council after the elections:

Ward results

References

1972 English local elections
1972
1970s in Sheffield